Grenada elects a legislature on the national level. The Parliament of Grenada has two chambers. The House of Representatives has 15 members, elected for a five-year term in single-seat constituencies. The Senate has 13 appointed members. 
Grenada has a two-party system, which means that there are two dominant political parties, with extreme difficulty for anybody to achieve electoral success under the banner of any other party.

Latest election

See also
Electoral calendar
Electoral system

External links
Adam Carr's Election Archive